Dmitry Sergeevich Gordievsky (born 24 April 1996) is a Russian chess grandmaster.

Chess career
Born in 1996, Gordievsky earned his international master title in 2016 and his grandmaster title in 2017. He is the No. 29 ranked Russian player as of February 2018.

In February 2018, he participated in the Aeroflot Open. He finished third out of ninety-two, scoring 6½/9 (+4–0=5).

References

External links

Living people
1996 births
Chess grandmasters
Russian chess players
Sportspeople from Moscow